Sergey Skrypnik (born February 2, 1973) is a Kazakhstani sprint canoer who competed in the mid-1990s. At the 1996 Summer Olympics in Atlanta, he was eliminated in the repechages of the K-2 1000 m event and the semifinals of the K-4 1000 m event.

External links
Sports-Reference.com profile

1973 births
Canoeists at the 1996 Summer Olympics
Kazakhstani male canoeists
Living people
Olympic canoeists of Kazakhstan
Asian Games medalists in canoeing
Canoeists at the 1994 Asian Games
Canoeists at the 1998 Asian Games
Asian Games gold medalists for Kazakhstan
Asian Games bronze medalists for Kazakhstan
Medalists at the 1994 Asian Games